Baltzar von Platen (1804–1875) was a Swedish noble and naval officer. He was a retired navy admiral. He served as the foreign minister of the United Kingdoms for one year between 1871 and 1872. He was also the governor-general in Norway between 1827 and 1829. von Platen started and directed the project to built the Gotha Canal which was constructed in the period 1810–1832. During this period he was the director of the Trollhätte Canal Company. von Platen initiated the eastern section of the canal.

One of the early vessels built at Hammarsten shipyard in Norrköping was named after Baltzar von Platen in 1834.

References

External links

19th-century Swedish politicians
19th-century Swedish military personnel
1804 births
1875 deaths
Swedish Ministers for Foreign Affairs
Swedish Navy admirals
19th-century Swedish diplomats